The Bayer designation τ Lupi (Tau Lupi) is shared by two star systems in the constellation Lupus:
τ1 Lupi (HD 126341)
τ2 Lupi (HD 126354)

Lupi, Tau
Lupus (constellation)